Kurukabaru Airport  is an airstrip serving the Amerindian village of Kurukabaru, in the Potaro-Siparuni Region of Guyana. An international repair team arrived in 2021 and performed urgent repairs to various aids to navigation.

See also

 List of airports in Guyana
 Transport in Guyana

References

External links
Bing Maps - Kurukabaru
Kurukabaru Airport
OurAirports - Kurukabaru

Airports in Guyana